The second USS Portland was a US Navy Anchorage class dock landing ship built at General Dynamics Quincy Shipbuilding Division at Quincy, Massachusetts, and commissioned in 1970. Portland was decommissioned in 2003 and stricken from the Naval Vessel Register in 2004. It was sunk as a target during an exercise off the Virginia coast later that year.

Photos

External links 

USS Portland (LSD-37) page at Military.com
USS Portland (LSD-37) page at Navsite
USS Portland (LSD-37) page at Navsource Online
Dictionary of American Naval Fighting Ships

 

Anchorage-class dock landing ships
Cold War amphibious warfare vessels of the United States
Vietnam War amphibious warfare vessels of the United States
Gulf War ships of the United States
Ships built in Quincy, Massachusetts
1969 ships